Wittlingen is a municipality in the southwestern German state of Baden-Württemberg, part of the district Lörrach. 

The coat of arms of Wittlingen was granted 1906 and shows the arms of Baden impaled by a plow iron as a symbol for the agricultural character of the town. The blazon is Or a Bend Gules impaling Azure a Plowshare Or point upwards.

References

Lörrach (district)
Baden